Kevin Barry Putt (born 28 July 1964) is a former rugby union player who played as a scrumhalf. He was born and raised in New Zealand and after moving to South Africa, he represented  during 1994 and 1996.

Playing career
During 1990 and 1991 he toured Europe and during that time he played club rugby for Terenure College RFC. In 1992 he joined the South African union, . He represented Natal, whose name was changed to the Sharks, as well as the Super Rugby team the Coastal Sharks, and played more than a hundred matches for the teams.

In 1994, Putt toured with the Springboks to Britain and Ireland and in 1996 to Argentina and Europe. He did not play in any test matches for the Springboks, but was an unused replacement in eight tests and played in eleven tour matches, scoring three tries.

He was in consideration for the Ireland national team until it was found he was not eligible despite having an Irish wife which entitled him to a passport, as he did not personally meet the requirements of residency or descent.

Coaching career
Kevin Putt was appointed as Rudolf Straeuli's replacement at the Natal Sharks when Straeuli was appointed Springbok coach, with Theo van Rensburg as assistant. Since 2017, Putt has been a teacher at King's College in Auckland where he teaches physical education and social studies. He is also housemaster of Selwyn house and the coach of the schools 1st XV.

See also
List of South Africa national rugby union players – Springbok no. 622

References 

1964 births
Living people
South African rugby union players
South Africa international rugby union players
Otago rugby union players
Waikato rugby union players
Sharks (rugby union) players
Sharks (Currie Cup) players
Sharks (rugby union) coaches
London Irish players
Rugby union scrum-halves
People educated at Cambridge High School, New Zealand
Rugby union players from Waikato
New Zealand emigrants to South Africa
New Zealand rugby union players
New Zealand expatriate rugby union players
New Zealand expatriate sportspeople in South Africa
New Zealand expatriate sportspeople in England
New Zealand expatriate sportspeople in Ireland
Expatriate rugby union players in South Africa
Expatriate rugby union players in England
Expatriate rugby union players in Ireland
South African expatriate sportspeople in England
South African expatriate sportspeople in Ireland
Naturalised citizens of South Africa
New Zealand rugby union coaches
South African rugby union coaches